The Ena is a wooden Thames sailing barge constructed in Harwich in 1906 that is resting on the flats adjacent to Stargate Marina in Hoo, Kent. She is a notable Dunkirk little ship reputed to have rescued 100 men.

In 2002, Ena was the focus of an episode of the Channel 4 TV series Salvage Squad.

History
The barge was built speculatively by W B McLearon at the Navy Yard slip, Harwich in 1906. R & W Paul Ltd, the grain and agricultural merchants bought her in 1907 to use in the grain trade. This was the second barge they had bought from W B McLearon's Navy Yard, as they has bought the Thalatta. They rigged her as a mulie in their own Dock End Shipyard.

First World War service
Ena served in the First World War, delivering supplies across the Channel to troops in France. Her shallow draught allowed her to operate in waters too shallow for the enemy U-boats.

Dunkirk evacuation
Thirteen Thames sailing barges made the crossing, six from R & W Paul Ltd's fleet. On the Dunkirk beaches, her crew were ordered to abandon her. She was beached but then refloated by Lt Colonel W G Mc Kay and men of the 19th Field Regiment, Royal Artillery, and taken back to Kent, notable as none of them was a sailorman.

See also
 Thalatta
 Will (Thames barge)

References

Bibliography

Thames sailing barges
Little Ships of Dunkirk
1906 ships
Transport on the River Thames
Sailing ships of the United Kingdom
Ships and vessels on the National Register of Historic Vessels
Ships built in Harwich